Vittorio Allievi (born 10 December 1962) is an Italian gymnast. He competed at the 1984 Summer Olympics and the 1988 Summer Olympics.

References

External links
 

1962 births
Living people
Italian male artistic gymnasts
Olympic gymnasts of Italy
Gymnasts at the 1984 Summer Olympics
Gymnasts at the 1988 Summer Olympics
People from Seregno
Sportspeople from the Province of Monza e Brianza
20th-century Italian people